is a Japanese voice actress affiliated with the talent agency VIMS.

Biography
Kurose was born on May 7 in Hiroshima Prefecture. She graduated from Hiroshima Jogakuin Junior & Senior High School, and Kwansei Gakuin University. While in college, she attended the Osaka branch of Japan Narration Actor Institute and transferred to the Tokyo branch after graduating. In 2014, she played her first major role as Qruit Kotobuki in the video game Tokyo 7th Sisters. While working as a voice actress, she also worked at a toy company, but left the company after she got to perform in a Tokyo 7th Sisters live concert because she wanted to focus on her voice acting career. She was cast in another main role as Kouko Nosa in the 2016 anime television series High School Fleet.

She was aspired to become a voice actress after listening to a Hoshin Engis drama CD and due to her activities in the broadcasting club at her school. When she was in high school, she went to one of the CD release events in Hiroshima and met Sakura Nogawa, who complimented her voice, which made Kurose became aware of her talent. She cited that having Miyu Matsuki as a senior at her school had also encouraged her to become a voice actress.

In October 2022, Kurose announced her marriage and the birth of her child.

Filmography

Anime

Video games

References

External links
 Official agency profile 
 

Japanese video game actresses
Japanese voice actresses
Kwansei Gakuin University alumni
Living people
Voice actresses from Hiroshima Prefecture
Year of birth missing (living people)